Hüseyin Koç (born 30 July 1979 in Bursa, Turkey) is a Turkish volleyball player. Since the 2012-13 season, he is a member of Halkbank Ankara.

Family life
Hüseyin Koç was born on 30 July 1979 in Bursa, Turkey. In his youth years, he played football as a goalkeeper. However, because unsuccessful, he switched over to playing volleyball.

In 2010, he married Dilay Okta, who played eight-year long in Nilüfer Belediyespor Women's Volleyball Team before she retired and returned to her profession as an interior architect. The couple has a son, Mehmet Kuzey, born in 2012.

Career
Koç played for Çankaya Belediyesi, Ziraat Bankası Ankara, Arkas Spor and Istanbul Büyükşehir Belediyespor before he signed for Halkbank Ankara in May 2012.

He was member of the Turkey men's national volleyball team, which became champion at the 2005 Summer Universiade held in İzmir, Turkey. He won the Men's CEV Cup 2012–13 with Halkbank Ankara and was named "Best Setter" of the tournament.

Hüseyin Koç was a member of the Turkey men's national volleyball team.

Awards

Individual
 Men's CEV Cup 2012–13 "Best Setter"

National team
 2005 Summer Universiade -

Club
 Men's CEV Cup 2012–13 -  Champion with Halkbank Ankara

References

1979 births
Sportspeople from Bursa
Living people
Turkish men's volleyball players
Çankaya Belediyesi volleyballers
Ziraat Bankası volleyball players
Istanbul Büyükşehir Belediyespor athletes
Arkas Spor volleyball players
Halkbank volleyball players
Universiade medalists in volleyball
Universiade gold medalists for Turkey
21st-century Turkish people